USCGC Acacia (WAGL-200) was originally built for service by the U.S. Army as a mine planter shortly after World War I and later transferred to the U.S. Lighthouse Service, which became part of the U.S. Coast Guard in 1939; when transferred the ship was redesignated as a Speedwell-class buoy tender. She was sunk in 1942 by a German U-boat.

Construction
Acacia was laid down by Fabricated Shipbuilding Corporation and Coddington Engineering Company, Milwaukee, Wisconsin, as the mine planter USAMP General John P. Story, for the U.S. Army, sometime around 1 October 1918. She was named for Major General John Patten Story, Chief of Artillery 1904–1905. She was launched on 15 September 1919 and was delivered around 1 May 1920, then commissioned into the Army's Mine Planter Service at Milwaukee.

Service history

Army – transfer to the Lighthouse Service
Acacia was a mine planter, USAMP General John P. Story, originally built for the U.S. Army in 1919. Although intended for the Coast Defenses of Pensacola, Florida, she never served there. Transferred in November 1920 to the Army Supply Base, Brooklyn, New York. Transferred in April 1921 to Fort Totten, New York in the Coast Defenses of Eastern New York. Transferred in August 1921 to Fort Monroe, Virginia in the Coast Defenses of Chesapeake Bay. The ship was decommissioned on 10 November 1921.

Six vessels of this type were transferred to the U.S. Lighthouse Service at no cost in 1921–1927 and redesignated as Speedwell-class lighthouse tenders, also functioning as buoy tenders. The original intent was for these vessels to serve a dual purpose: mine planter in case of a war, and lighthouse tender during peacetime. Unfortunately, this conversion proved to be impracticable and too expensive and they were modified exclusively for service as tenders at a cost of between $41,022 to $110,963. Each had a turtleback forecastle installed and their anchors were mounted high to prevent the ship from being hung up on a buoy she was servicing. A steel main deck was added forward; new windows were installed in the pilothouse, and a new refrigerating plant was added. All vessels were then commissioned from 1923 to 1927 with new names.

Lighthouse Service and Coast Guard service
Acacia was assigned to the San Juan, Puerto Rico, area 21 April 1927. The ship's field of operations included Puerto Rico and adjacent islands, Virgin Islands, Guantánamo Bay, and Cuba. Although the ship was designated as a lighthouse tender she was also used to perform construction and repair of stations, small structures, piers, etc. in addition to her work of tending aids to navigation. After the San Felipe hurricane on 13 September 1928, the crew nicknamed themselves "The Acacia Construction Company" because of the number of repairs they performed. She ran aground off Fajardo, Puerto Rico, in September 1932, during a hurricane, probably the San Ciprian hurricane, but was safely refloated.

The ship's main mission was to place and repair aids to navigation equipment, in which they maintained approximately 255 during her time in service. The crew 
supported shore lights, unwatched lights, lighted buoys, unlighted buoys and beacons, and radio beacons on both the Panama Canals Atlantic and Pacific sides, the western Caribbean, Morro Puercas and the Jicarita Island Lights. In addition, Acacia rendered numerous salvage services involving vessels and persons in distress. The most notable was the rescue of the Brazilian training ship Almirante Saldanha. The vessel and its crew were given up for lost after the ship had run aground off San Juan Harbor Entrance 25  July 1938. Acacia rescued her crew, and the rescue created a celebration in Brazil and gained the attention of international officials.

In June 1938, Boatswain Ora Doyle took command of the tender from Master John A. Anderson, who transferred to command . In late 1939, Acacia and the cutter  towed the seized Italian tanker Colorado, which had its engine room damaged through sabotage by its interned crew, from San Juan to Galveston, Texas for repairs, one of the longest towing operations in Coast Guard history to that time.

Sinking
The U-boat opened fire on the unarmed tender with 68 rounds from her /45 caliber deck gun, 92 rounds from her /83 caliber anti-aircraft (AA) gun, and 70 rounds from her /65 caliber AA gun. Acacia caught fire and the entire crew of Acacia abandoned ship before she sank by the stern. The survivors were located by a PBY "Catalina" and picked up by the destroyer . They were landed at San Juan 16 March 1942. She was the only U.S. buoy tender sunk by enemy action during the war.

See also
 List of ships of the United States Army § Mine Planters

Notes

Citations

Bibliography

Online resources

External links
USCGC Acacia at www.uboat.net

 

1920 ships
Ships built in Milwaukee
Mine planters of the United States Army
Ships of the United States Coast Guard
Ships of the United States Lighthouse Service
Ships sunk by German submarines in World War II
World War II shipwrecks in the Caribbean Sea